The 2020 Ligai Olii Tojikiston (Tajik: 2020 Лигаи Олии Тоҷикистон),, or 2020 Tajikistan Higher League is the 29th season of Ligai Olii Tojikiston, Tajikistan's top division of association football. The season began on 5 April 2020.

Season events
On 27 March, the Tajikistan Football Federation announced that the opening round of games would be played behind closed doors due to the threat of the COVID-19 pandemic.

On 25 April, the Tajikistan Football Federation announced the suspension of football, following the completion of Round 4 on 26 April, until 10 May.

On 6 May, the Tajikistan Football Federation extended the suspension of football indefinitely due to the spread of COVID-19 pandemic in Tajikistan.

On 8 June, the Tajikistan Football Federation announced that the season would resume on 16 June, with the games continuing to be played without spectators.

Teams
On 20 March 2020, the Tajikistan Football Federation announced that the season would involve ten teams, with there being 27 matches in three rounds. The teams consist of CSKA Pamir, Istiklol, Istaravshan, Khatlon, Khujand, Kuktosh, Regar-TadAZ and newly promoted Dushanbe-83, Fayzkand and Lokomotiv-Pamir.

Personnel and sponsoring

Foreign players
Each Tajikistan Higher League club is permitted to register six foreign players, with four allowed on the pitch at the same time.

In bold: Players that have been capped for their national team.

Managerial changes

League table

Fixtures and results

Rounds 1–18

Season statistics

Scoring
 First goal of the season: Ilhomjon Barotov for Istaravshan against Khatlon

Top scorers

Hat-tricks

 4 Player scored 4 goals
 5 Player scored 5 goals

References

External links
Football federation of Tajikistan

Tajikistan Higher League seasons
1
Tajik
Tajikistan Higher League, 2020